Lewis Walker may refer to:
 Lewis Walker (footballer), English footballer
 Lewis L. Walker, U.S. Representative from Kentucky

See also
 Walker Lewis, African-American abolitionist, Freemason, and Mormon elder